Siemianówka  is a village in the administrative district of Gmina Narewka, within Hajnówka County, Podlaskie Voivodeship, in north-eastern Poland, at the border with Belarus. The village has a population of 660, most of whom are ethnic Belarusians that are part of Poland's Belarusian minority.

References

Villages in Hajnówka County